Dwight Leroy Siebler (August 5, 1937 – June 16, 2021) was an American professional baseball player. A right-handed pitcher who attended the University of Nebraska-Lincoln, he spent one full season (1966) and parts of four others in Major League Baseball for the Minnesota Twins.

Siebler began his pro career with the Philadelphia Phillies and was in his fifth season with the Phils' minor league organization when his contract was purchased by the Twins in late August 1963. He made five starts in seven appearances for Minnesota during the remainder of the season and turned in two complete game victories, defeating the Washington Senators 10–1 on three hits August 29 and the Detroit Tigers 3–1 on four hits September 17. He made only three more starts during his Major League career.

Siebler spent parts of the 1964 and 1965 seasons in Triple-A. During 1966, his full season with Minnesota, Siebler worked in 23 games, with two starts, and recorded his two other big-league victories and his one MLB save. On August 17, against the California Angels, he earned his final Major League win with 6 innings of relief, allowing one unearned run, and enabling the Twins to come from behind to win, 5–3.

Siebler appeared in 48 Major League games pitched. In 117 innings, he allowed only 97 hits, with 71 strikeouts and 44 bases on balls. He left professional baseball after the 1967 season.

Siebler died in Omaha, Nebraska, in June 2021 at the age of 83.

References

External links

1937 births
2021 deaths
Arkansas Travelers players
Atlanta Crackers players
Bakersfield Bears players
Baseball players from Nebraska
Buffalo Bisons (minor league) players
Dallas Rangers players
Denver Bears players
Major League Baseball pitchers
Minnesota Twins players
Nebraska Cornhuskers baseball players
People from Columbus, Nebraska
Syracuse Chiefs players
Williamsport Grays players